Several ships of the French Navy have borne the name Prudent or Prudente:

Ships named Prudent 
, a 58-gun ship, condemned in 1696.
, a 60-gun ship, burnt to avoid capture during the Battle of Vigo Bay in 1702.
, a 74-gun ship, burnt to avoid capture during the Siege of Louisbourg in 1758.
, a flûte, which foundered in 1772.

Ships named Prudente 
She was sold in 1803.

French Navy ship names